Arnold-Eduard Lainevool (also Arnold-Eduard Tan(n)aur; born 17 November 1904 Tallinn) was an Estonian politician. He was a member of the V Riigikogu, representing the Estonian Socialist Workers' Party. He was a member of the Riigikogu since 27 September 1937. He replaced Johannes Hiob.

References

1904 births
Year of death missing
Politicians from Tallinn
People from Kreis Harrien
Estonian Socialist Workers' Party politicians
Members of the Riigikogu, 1932–1934